Chatham Central Ward is one of the wards of Medway Council in Medway, England. The population of this ward in Chatham, Kent, at the 2011 Census was 16,413. In the 2019 Medway Council election it elected three Labour Councillors: Harinder Mahil, Vince Maple and Siju Adeoye.  In December 2022 Adeoye joined the Conservative Party.

Location 
Chatham Central covers the area of Chatham south of the A2 to the  junction of Walderslade Road and Magpie Hall Road. Bounded by Magpie Hall Road and Maidstone Road, also including the area around Balfour Junior stretching out to Boundary Road and the All Saints area of Castle Road and Gordon Road.

Neighbouring Wards 
Chatham Central is adjacent to the following wards:
 River
 Luton and Wayfield
 Rochester South and Horsted
 Rochester East

References

External links 
  http://democracy.medway.gov.uk/mgMemberIndex.aspx?FN=WARD&VW=TABLE&PIC=1
 https://web.archive.org/web/20081006065025/http://www.medwaylabour.org.uk/councillorsdetails

Politics of Medway
Wards of Kent
Chatham, Kent